The  Kaohsiung Truth were a professional basketball team based in Kaohsiung, Taiwan. The Truth played one season in the ASEAN Basketball League.

History
Kaohsiung Truth was founded in 2016 as the first professional basketball team to play in Kaohsiung City. They were officially announced as a member of the ASEAN Basketball League on July 17, 2016. The Truth are the league's first Christian ministry team. They played in the 2016-17 season but was disbanded after the end of the season. The Formosa Dreamers replaced them as the sole Taiwanese team in the ABL in the 2017-18 season.

Home arena
The Truth played their home games at the Kaohsiung Municipal Kaohsiung Senior High School Gym.

Former players
  Mikee Reyes (2016–2017)
  Sabatino Chen (2016-2017)
  Jay Wey (2016-2017)
  Ku Jen-Chieh (2016-2017)
  Luo Jun-Quan (2016-2017)
  Wang Hsin-Kai (2016-2017)
  Raymar Jose (2016-2017)
  Lin Zhong-Xian (2016-2017)
  Chang Hao-Chun (2016-2017)
  Achie Inigo (2016-2017)
  Carlos Andrade (2016-2017)
  Huang Ya-Chung (2016-2017)
  Chris Oliver (2016-2017)
  Yeh Jia-Hao (2016-2017)
  Wesley Hsu (2016-2017)
  Derek Hall (2016-2017)
  Lee Wei-Min (2016-2017)

Head coaches

Season-by-season record

References

Kaohsiung Truth
ASEAN Basketball League teams
Basketball teams established in 2016
2016 establishments in Taiwan
Defunct basketball teams in Taiwan
Basketball teams disestablished in 2017
2017 disestablishments in Taiwan
Sport in Kaohsiung